Haidar Malik Chadurah (died 1627) was an administrator, and soldier in Kashmir in the service of Salim Nuruddin Jahangir, the fourth Mughal Emperor from 1605 until his death in 1627. Haidar Malik wrote the best known Persian-language history of Kashmir (completed 1621) one of several books entitled Tarikh-i-Kashmir, identified as Tarikh-i-Haidar Malik. Malik Muhammad Chadurah was born in Chadurah, a village ten miles south of Srinagar, as the son of Hasan Malik. His history was translated into English as Haidar Malik Chadurah History of Kashmir, Raja Bano, Bhavna Prakashan, 1991.

Family

The decedents of Haider Malik are currently residing in the downtown Zaidibal. As per the records the heads of 3 families of Haider Malik are:

 Malik Muhammad Ali- who is survived by a son and a daughter. The son is a retired doctor Malik Nazir and is living in Qamari wari area.
 Malik Ali Muhammad- survived by 2 sons and 2 daughters. Both the sons are retired, the elder one Malik Hafiz retired as chief Hoticulture office.
 Malik Ghulam Hussain- survived by 3 sons and 3 daughters. The elder son Malik Mushtaq is Retired Sericulture Assistant and another son Malik Altaf is a prominent businessman in the valley.

References

History of Kashmir
People from Srinagar
17th-century Indian people
1627 deaths
Year of birth missing
17th-century Indian non-fiction writers
17th-century Indian writers
17th-century Indian historians
17th-century Persian-language writers
Historians of India